Workday Adaptive Planning, formerly Adaptive Insights, is a software as a service company headquartered in Palo Alto, California and founded in 2003. The company's acquisition by Workday, Inc. was completed in August 2018.

History
In 2003, Robert S. Hull and Richard L. Dellinger co-founded Adaptive Planning to market enterprise budgeting, forecasting, and reporting software as an alternative to spreadsheet-based planning or larger, on-premises software. Adaptive Planning was an early user of the software as a service (SaaS) model for business intelligence and corporate performance management.
The company was founded in late 2003 and incorporated in Delaware as Visus Technology and then renamed Adaptive Planning. It was incubated at Onset Ventures in Menlo Park, California. In September 2012 the company acquired the Louisville, Colorado based company  for an undisclosed amount. By October 2013, Adaptive Planning held a fourth round of funding, raising $45 million and added salesforce.com as a backer.

In February 2014, Adaptive Planning was renamed Adaptive Insights and released a new version of the software with an updated user interface.

In January 2015, the company appointed Citrix Chairman Tom Bogan as CEO. In June 2015 the company reported another investment round of $75 million with several investors, including Norwest Venture Partners, ONSET Ventures, Bessemer Venture Partners, Cardinal Venture Capital, Information Venture Partners, and others.

In June 2016, Adaptive Insights appeared in the Leaders Quadrant of a Gartner Strategic CPM report and marked the first time a cloud-only vendor was in the leaders section of the Strategic CPM Magic Quadrant. In 2017, Gartner included only cloud companies in its 2017 Magic Quadrant for Cloud Strategic Corporate Performance Management Solutions report. Adaptive Insights was placed highest in the Leader's quadrant for ability to execute.

In December 2017, the company surpassed $100 million in annualized revenue, an accomplishment that fewer than 1% of software companies achieve. In April 2018, the company announced it added 500 net new customers in fiscal 2018 and currently has more than 3,700 customers worldwide.

In June 2018, Workday agreed to acquire Adaptive Insights for approximately $1.55 billion.

In August 2018, Workday completed the acquisition of Adaptive Insights, announcing that the company would operate as Adaptive Insights, a Workday company.

In May 2020, Adaptive Insights rebranded once again and was renamed Workday Adaptive Planning.

Product

Workday Adaptive Planning covers the planning, consolidation, analytics and reporting functions with its Business Planning Cloud.

The company offers Adaptive Insights for Finance, Adaptive Insights for Sales, and Adaptive Insights for Workforce planning as well as the capability to flexibly model virtually any kind of functional use, such as project, capacity and operational planning.

The application is built on an In-memory database, has an in-browser user interface similar to that of a spreadsheet, and the drag-and-drop characteristics of a web-based consumer application. Adaptive Insights automates consolidations and integration of data from other systems and enables collaboration and real-time updates via its on-demand SaaS-based model.

Partners
In 2009, Adaptive Insights partnered with NetSuite, Inc. and currently is a member of the SuiteCloud Developer Network. The company also integrates with other cloud ERP solutions from Sage Intacct, Microsoft, and others.

Adaptive Insights has partners in Australia, Canada, Europe, India, Japan, New Zealand, the UK and the United States.

See also
 Cloud computing
 Corporate performance management

References

Software companies based in California
Companies based in Palo Alto, California
Software companies established in 2003
2003 establishments in California
Organizational performance management
Business intelligence companies
2018 mergers and acquisitions
Defunct software companies of the United States